The Wai-iti River is in the north of the South Island of New Zealand. It flows northeast for  before combining with the Wairoa River to form the Waimea River. This flows into the southern end of Tasman Bay / Te Tai-o-Aorere near Richmond.

References

Rivers of the Tasman District
Rivers of New Zealand